Dankwart Guratzsch (born 14 June 1939) is a German journalist. He has made a name for himself above all as an architecture critic.

Life 
Guratzsch was born in Dresden in 1939, the son of the writer and teacher Curt Guratzsch (1891-1965). In 1957, he left his native city for West Germany. After studying history and German studies in Marburg, Munich and Hamburg, he was awarded a doctorate in 1970 at the Faculty of Philosophy of the University of Hamburg with Macht durch Organisation. Die Grundlegung des Hugenbergschen Presseimperiums, a dissertation about Alfred Hugenberg. In 1957, he left his native city and went to West Germany.

Guratzsch began in the mid-1970s as a feature editor at the daily newspaper Die Welt, where he specialised in architecture as well as urban planning and urban design. Even before this was taken up in other media, Guratzsch advocated a cautious approach to architectural heritage and urban planning that was oriented towards the traditions of the respective place. He was particularly displeased with the urban planning developments in the German Democratic Republic. In critical articles he reported on the demolition of  quarters there, rejecting commuter towns, housing estates and Plattenbau quarters as "red urbanism". He always advocated private home ownership as well as the preservation and sustainable maintenance of old building quarters - especially those of historism from the Gründerzeit - in West and East. The Ministry of State Security of the GDR observed Guratzsch suspiciously, his  comprises 200 pages.

Guratzsch remained particularly attached to his hometown of Dresden, whose air raids on Dresden had sharpened his view of architecture and urban planning throughout his life. After the fall of the Berlin wall, he became involved in numerous reports and reportages as well as in various committees for a history-oriented reconstruction of the city, especially of the Frauenkirche as its centrepiece. He welcomed the reconstruction of the Berlin Palace.

Guratzsch suggested the establishment of a "bomb war museum" in Dresden. He proposes the large  in Dresden-Reick as the location. For him, Bombing of Dresden stands symbolically for the horrors of the Bombing War like no other city in Europe. 

During the 1980s, in the course of the debate on the so-called Forest dieback, he also dealt journalistically with the phenomenon of new forest damage and published the book Baumlos in die Zukunft? (1984), which brought together expert contributions from twelve experts - among them several forest scientists.

Guratzsch received several awards for his publications in the field of Cultural heritage management and as an architecture critic. The  awarded him the German Prize for Monument Protection twice: the Journalist Prize in 1976 and the "Silver Hemisphere" in 1980. Guratzsch is on the board of trustees of the Deutsche Stiftung Denkmalschutz.

The journalist is one of the critics of the German orthography reform of 1996.

Guratzsch lives and works mainly in Frankfurt.

Publications 
 Macht durch Organisation. Die Grundlegung des Hugenbergschen Presseimperiums. Dissertationsschrift, Hamburg 1970 (im Druck als Band 7 der Reihe Studien zur modernen Geschichte, Bertelsmann-Universitätsverlag, Gütersloh 1974).
 as publisher: Baumlos in die Zukunft? Kindler, Munich 1984, .
 as publisher: Das neue Berlin. Konzepte der Internationalen Bauausstellung 1987 für einen Städtebau mit Zukunft. Mann, Berlin 1987, .
 Wieviel ist Braunschweig seine Mitte wert? Die Stadt, das Schloß und das Center. (Braunschweiger Museumsvorträge, vol. 5). Braunschweigisches Landesmuseum, Braunschweig 2003, .

Awards 
 1976: Deutscher Preis für Denkmalschutz – Journalistenpreis – of the 
 1980: Deutscher Preis für Denkmalschutz – Silberne Halbkugel – of the Deutschen Nationalkomitees für Denkmalschutz

Quote 
 Only the city of short distances, the city of density, diversity and livability is capable of survival.

References

Further reading 
 Rainer Haubrich: Die Geschichte, die Stadt, das Haus – Dankwart Guratzsch wird 65. In Die Welt, 14 June 2004.
 Rainer Haubrich:  Dieser Mann ist die Stimme der schönen Stadt - Eine Würdigung zu Dankwart Guratzschs 75. Geburtstag. In Die Welt, 14 June 2014.

External links 
 
 Articles by Dankwart Guratzsch
 Rainer Haubrich: Dieser Mann ist die Stimme der schönen Stadt. In Welt.de, 14 June 2014

20th-century German journalists
German architecture critics
German non-fiction writers
1939 births
Living people
People from Dresden
University of Hamburg alumni